Rowing at the 2014 Asian Games was held in Chungju Tangeum Lake International Rowing Center, Incheon, South Korea from September 20 to 25, 2014.

Schedule

Medalists

Men

Women

Medal table

Participating nations
A total of 224 athletes from 19 nations competed in rowing at the 2014 Asian Games:

References

External links 
 

 
2014 Asian Games events
Asian Games
2014
2014 Asian Games